Im Yoon-ah (born May 30, 1990), known mononymously as Yoona, is a South Korean singer and actress. She is a member of girl group Girls' Generation, and its subgroup Girls' Generation-Oh!GG.

Film

Television series

Web series

Television shows

Hosting

References 

South Korean filmographies